Mützenich may refer to:

Places 
 Mützenich (bei Prüm), municipality in the district of Bitburg-Prüm, Rhineland-Palatinate, Germany
 Mützenich (Monschau), village in the municipality of Monschau, North Rhine-Westphalia, Germany

People with that surname 
 Rolf Mützenich, politician of the Social Democratic Party of Germany

Disambiguation pages with surname-holder lists